Literary Mama (LiteraryMama.com) is a U.S.-based online literary magazine focused on publishing writing about motherhood in a variety of genres. The writings found in Literary Mama challenge all types of media to rethink its narrow focus of what mothers think and do. Updated monthly, the departments include columns, creative nonfiction, fiction, Literary Reflections, poetry, Profiles and Reviews, OpEd, and a blog. Literary Mama reaches 40,000 readers monthly.

History
Inspired by the variety of mothers and mothering, co-founder Amy Hudock sought out and gathered women in Berkeley, California interested in reading and writing about motherhood. This group challenged the conventional two-way street of motherhood commonly found in mainstream media: either "sickly sweet" or utterly negative. "We weren't able to get our work published because the glossy parenting magazines only wanted articles that showed only a small part of motherhood and we wanted a place where we could publish our work and find work we wanted to read," says Ms. Hudock. With the collaboration of co-founder Andrea J. Buchanan, Literary Mama: A Literary Magazine for the Maternally Inclined was born. The first issue appeared in November 2003.

The online magazine today 

The magazine's mission since 2003, as stated on its website, is to feature "poetry, fiction, columns, and creative nonfiction that may be too raw, too irreverent, too ironic, or too body-conscious for traditional or commercial motherhood publications." A weekly ezine is sent highlighting new works specific to department, column, and the blog. True to the mission of Literary Mama, the magazine encourages Mama and non-Mama writers alike to submit work for review and for possible publication. The Literary Reflections department posts a monthly writing prompt, and classes are offered to help writers reach their goals. 

Literary Mama was named by Writer's Digest as one of the "101 Best Websites for Writers" and by Forbes for "Best of the Web".

An anthology of selected pieces from 2003 to 2005 was published in December 2005 by Seal Press, .

Editors 

 Caroline Grant, PhD, Editor in Chief, 2009 – present 
 Amy Hudock, PhD, 2003 – 2009

Notable contributors 
Below is a listing of contributors to the Literary Mama body of work at LiteraryMama.com who have published books:

Gail Konop Baker, author of Cancer is a Bitch, Da Capo Press, 2008.
Andrea Buchanan, co-author of The Daring Book for Girls, Collins, 2007.
Elrena Evans, co-editor of Mama PhD:Women Write about Motherhood and Academic Life, Rutgers University Press, 2008 and This Crowded Night, DreamSeeker Books, 2011.
Vicki Forman, contributor, Love You to Pieces: Creative Writers on Raising a Child with Special Needs, Beacon Press, 2008 
Caroline Grant, co-editor of Mama PhD:Women Write about Motherhood and Academic Life, Rutgers University Press, 2008
Ona Gritz, author of Tangerines and Tea: My Grandparents and Me, Abrams Books for Young Readers, 2005
Jessica Berger Gross, editor of About What Was Lost: Twenty Writers on Miscarriage, Healing, and Hope, Plume, 2006
Sonya Huber, author of Opa Nobody, University of Nebraska Press, 2008
Amy Hudock, co-editor of Literary Mama: Reading for the Maternally Inclined, Seal Press, 2005
Susan Ito, co-editor of A Ghost at Heart's Edge: Stories and Poems of Adoption, North Atlantic Books, 1999 
Suzanne Kamata, editor of Love You to Pieces: Creative Writers on Raising a Child with Special Needs, Beacon Press, 2008
Sharon Kraus, author of Strange Land, University Press of Florida, 2002
Ericka Lutz, author of On the Go with Baby, Sourcebooks, 2002
Jennifer Margulis, author of Why Babies Do That: Baffling Baby Behavior Explained, Willow Creek Press, 2005
Sophia Raday, author of Love in Condition Yellow: A Memoir of an Unlikely Marriage, Beacon Press, 2009
Heidi Raykeil, author of Naughty Mommy: How I Found My Lost Libido, Seal Press, 2005
Rachel Sarah, author of Single Mom Seeking: Playdates, Blind Dates, and Other Dispatches from the Dating World, Seal Press, 2007
Shari MacDonald Strong, editor of The Maternal Is Political: Women Writers at the Intersection of Motherhood and Social Change, Seal Press, 2008

Other 

1. Original graphic for Literary Mama was designed by Andi Buchanan.

2. Graphic for front cover of anthology was designed by Justin Marler and Gerilyn Attebery for Seal Press.

References

External links
 Literary Mama website.

Magazines established in 2003
Magazines published in California
Online literary magazines published in the United States
Online magazines published in the United States
Parenting magazines